The Mundialito de Clubes is an international club beach soccer competition contested between top men's clubs from around the world. The tournament is loosely similar to the FIFA Club World Cup in association football, however participating teams are not regional champions, instead entering via invitation.

Organised by Beach Soccer Worldwide (BSWW), the competition was founded by BSWW with Brazilian sports agency Koch Tavares in 2011. The first five editions hosted in Brazil whilst the sixth saw the event hosted in Europe; the tournament should not be confused with BSWW's existing Mundialito, which takes place in Portugal for national teams.

Portuguese and Russian sides Braga and Lokomotiv Moscow are the most successful teams with two titles each.

Teams and players
In the first two editions (2011 and 2012), squads were specially assembled to represent well known association football clubs from around the world – these teams were incarnated purely to compete in this event. Players of many nationalities (of which they were considered the best of) were invited to play; they were then allocated to one of the clubs specifically for the purpose of the event using a draft system conducted by BSWW. The draft system was then retired.

In the next two editions (2013 and 2015), the clubs and their squads that competed either already exist beforehand (i.e. competed in a domestic club league in their country) or remained specially assembled purely for the competition, but now with squads materialised behind the scenes with players choosing to play for said team at their own discretion rather than via a draft.

Since 2017, all competing teams have been pre-existing clubs that compete in their country's domestic league. Teams are no longer materialised specifically for this event.

Results

Performance

By club

By country

By confederation

Awards

See also
BSWW Mundialito

References

External links
Beach Soccer Worldwide, official website
Club Mundialito, at Beach Soccer Russia (in Russian)

 
Beach soccer competitions
Recurring sporting events established in 2011